Furtsev is a Russian masculine surname, its feminine counterpart is Furtseva. Notable people with the surname include:
Leonid Furtsev (born 1999), Russian football player
Yekaterina Furtseva (1910–1974), Soviet politician

Russian-language surnames